Richard Mráz (born February 19, 1993) is a Slovak ice hockey player. He is currently playing with HC Leukergrund of the Regionale Eishockeymeisterschaft "REMS".

Mráz previously played in the Kontinental Hockey League (KHL), making his debut playing with HC Lev Poprad during the 2011–12 KHL season.  During the 2013-14 KHL season, he played for HC Slovan Bratislava, before being loaned to HK Nitra to finish the season.

References

External links

1993 births
Living people
HC Lev Poprad players
Ottawa 67's players
Slovak ice hockey forwards
People from Nové Zámky
Sportspeople from the Nitra Region
Slovak expatriate ice hockey players in Canada
Slovak expatriate ice hockey players in the Czech Republic
Slovak expatriate ice hockey players in Sweden